André Riaan Warner (born 2 September 1993) is a South African professional rugby union player for the  in the United Rugby Championship and the  in the Currie Cup. His regular position is scrum-half.

Career

Youth / Western Province

In July 2011, Warner was included in the Western Province side that participated at the premier high school rugby union competition in South Africa, the Under-18 Craven Week tournament held in Kimberley. He scored two tries in the competition, one in each of their matches against Border and the Pumas.

In 2012, he was included in the  squad that competed in the 2012 Under-19 Provincial Championship.

Blue Bulls / UP Tuks

His appearances consisted of seven matches in the round-robin stage of the tournament of which UP Tuks won them all to qualify to the semi-finals, as well as their semi-final defeat to the NWU Pukke, losing 28–29 to miss out on a home semi-final.

Less than two weeks after his final Vartisy Cup match, Warner also made his first class debut. He started their Round Five match against Namibian side  in Windhoek and helped the Blue Bulls to a 44–0 victory. Warner missed out on the Blue Bulls' play-off matches in the competition, as he was included in the ' Super Rugby squad for their tour to Australia and New Zealand, but failed to get any game-time during the tour.

Warner was included in the ' senior squad for the 2015 Currie Cup Premier Division and was named as the scrum-half replacement for their Round Four match against  in Kimberley.

References

South African rugby union players
Living people
1993 births
Rugby union players from Cape Town
Rugby union scrum-halves
Blue Bulls players
Bulls (rugby union) players
Stade Français players
Lions (United Rugby Championship) players
Golden Lions players